Cheung Man Yee ISO is the first Chinese person to become Director of Broadcasting (head of Radio Television Hong Kong) in the Hong Kong Government.

She joined Radio Television Hong Kong as a Programme Officer in 1972. From 1999 to 2002 she was the principal Hong Kong Economic and Trade Representative in Tokyo, Japan.

Cheung Man Yee is currently the Honorary Vice Chairman of the Shunhing Education and Charitable Foundation of Hong Kong.

References 

Hong Kong civil servants
Government officials of Hong Kong
Cantonese people
Living people
1946 births
Companions of the Imperial Service Order